General elections were held in Brazil on 2 December 1945, the first since the establishment of Getúlio Vargas' Estado Novo. The presidential elections were won by Eurico Gaspar Dutra of the Social Democratic Party (PSD), whilst the PSD also won a majority of seats in both the Chamber of Deputies and the Senate. Voter turnout was 83.1% in the presidential election, 83.5% in the Chamber elections and 76.7% in the Senate elections.

Background
Following the end of World War II, Vargas was forced by the military to re-democratize the country. However, the military feared that Vargas would suspend the elections like he had suspended the scheduled 1938 elections in 1937 and staged a preventive coup which prematurely removed Vargas from power on October 29, 1945 and installed a caretaker government led by José Linhares to ensure the free and fair carry-out of the elections.

During this era of liberalization, Vargas founded two parties: the Social Democratic Party (PSD), a centre-right party composed primarily of the national industrial bourgeoisie which had supported Vargas and Vargas' interventors in the states, and the Brazilian Labour Party (PTB) composed of the urban working class and trade union movement. The PSD would become the largest party of the two, although Vargas used the PTB as his personal machine. The PSD consistently had the largest number of deputies until the 1964 military coup. The Vargista coalition had nominated Vargas' War Minister Eurico Gaspar Dutra earlier in 1945, but the PTB and Vargas offered Dutra's fledgling candidacy only lukewarm support.

Vargas' traditional opponents had founded the National Democratic Union (UDN) in April 1945. The UDN, a conservative party defending economic liberalism through public incentive to foreign capital, was mostly a party of intellectuals and the urban middle-class, as well as the remnants of the oligarchic interests of the República Velha. It nominated the former tenente and Air Force brigadier Eduardo Gomes, later known for participating in the 1964 coup, as its presidential candidate. Gomes notably advocated repealing a majority of the social legislation and labour reforms passed during the Vargas rule.

The recently legalized Brazilian Communist Party elected 14 deputies, and the party's popular leader, Luís Carlos Prestes was elected to the Senate in Guanabara. Getúlio Vargas, nominated by the PSD and his Brazilian Labour Party (PTB) in various states including Rio Grande do Sul was elected to the Senate representing Rio Grande do Sul and São Paulo as well as elected to the Chamber in six states and Rio de Janeiro. He opted to accept the Senate seat he won for the PSD (although he supported the PTB) in Rio Grande do Sul. Former President Artur Bernardes standing for election to the Senate in Minas Gerais for the Republican Party was defeated, placing third with 21.4% of the vote.

Results

President

Chamber of Deputies

Senate
In the Senate elections each voter had two votes.

References

General elections in Brazil
Brazil
1945 in Brazil
December 1945 events in South America
Election and referendum articles with incomplete results